Dave Gillett is a Scottish retired football defender who spent most of his career in the North American Soccer League.

Gillett began his professional career with Hibernian and was transferred to Crewe Alexandra in August 1972. Crewe Alexandra sent him on loan in 1974 to the Seattle Sounders of the North American Soccer League.  In 1975, the team sold his contract to the Sounders.  Following the 1975 NASL season, he played on loan with Caroline Hills in the Hong Kong First Division League.  In 1978, he broke his leg in the opening game of the NASL season.  Although he remained on the Sounders' rosters through the 1980 season, he never played a first team game again.  Gillett remained in the Seattle area after his retirement and coached at the amateur and youth levels including running summer camps and clinics for F.C. Seattle.  He later served as the team's general manager until 1980.

References

External links
 NASL stats
 1976 Sounders profile

1951 births
Living people
Crewe Alexandra F.C. players
Hibernian F.C. players
North American Soccer League (1968–1984) players
North American Soccer League (1968–1984) indoor players
Seattle Sounders (1974–1983) players
Scottish footballers
Scottish expatriate footballers
Expatriate soccer players in the United States
Footballers from Edinburgh
English Football League players
Association football defenders
Scottish expatriate sportspeople in the United States